Castelli may refer to:

Places

Argentina 
 Castelli, Buenos Aires, city in Buenos Aires Province
 Castelli Partido, partido in Buenos Aires Province
 Juan José Castelli, Chaco, in Chaco Province
 Villa Castelli, Argentina, in La Rioja Province
 Villa Castelli helicopter collision

Italy 
 Castelli, Abruzzo, in the province of Teramo
 Castelli Calepio, in the province of Bergamo
 Castelli Romani, in the province of Rome
 Villa Castelli, in the province of Brindisi

Other uses 
 Castelli (surname)
 Castelli (brand), an Italian cycling clothing manufacturer
 Castelli (grape), another name for the Italian wine grape Trebbiano

See also
 Castel (disambiguation)
 Castella (disambiguation)
 Castello (disambiguation)
 Castells (disambiguation)
 Castile (disambiguation)
 Castillo (disambiguation)
 Castle (disambiguation)